I'la al-Sunan is a comprehensive work that aims to clarify the role and importance of hadiths in the Hanafi school of Islamic thought, particularly in response to criticisms from the Ahl-i Hadith movement in India. Zafar Ahmad Usmani, the author, dedicated over twenty years to crafting the book, which includes more than 6,100 hadiths and their sources, along with evaluations of their chain of transmission and text. Ashraf Ali Thanwi, Usmani's teacher, entrusted him with the task of writing the book. In addition to its scholarly value, I'la al-Sunan also addresses contemporary issues and opposes certain movements, such as the Qadiani movement and efforts to make interest halal. The book has received praise for its meticulousness and objective evaluation of the opinions of the schools of Islamic law.

The first eleven volumes of I'la al-Sunan were published in Thana Bhawan from 1922 onwards, with the remaining volumes published in Karachi. Organized according to the chapters of Islamic jurisprudence, the book covers a broad range of topics, from purification and prayer to ethics and spirituality. The hadiths and statements of the Companions that support Hanafi views are cited with their sources at the top of the page, and weak narrations are included to support authentic narrations. The bottom of the page contains critiques of the narrations and their legal aspects, along with quotations from the reliable books of the Hanafi school where there are differences of opinion.

Background 
The primary purpose of writing the book was to defend the Hanafi school of thought against allegations made by some scholars in India in the mid-20th century. These scholars, known as Ahl al-Hadith, opposed the use of hadith in many matters and claimed that the Hanafi imams did not give enough importance to hadith. To support the views of the Hanafi school of thought, Ashraf Ali Thanwi, a prominent Hanafi scholar, had written a work called Ihya al-Sunna containing hadiths. However, the drafts of this work were lost, and Ashraf Ali Thanwi assigned Ahmad Hasan Sambhali to work on a similar project. However, Ashraf Ali Thanwi was not satisfied with the first volume of Ahmad Hasan Sambhali's Ihya al-Sunna and asked Zafar Ahmad Usmani to write a response to his mistakes. Usmani then wrote Istidrak al-Hasan 'ala Ihya al-Sunna. After Ashraf Ali Thanwi greatly admired Usmani's work, he stopped the publication of Ahmad Hasan Sambhali's work and assigned Usmani to write the book. Usmani worked on the book for twenty years, naming the text part of the book I'la al-Sunan and the commentary part Isdâü’l-minen.

Methodology 
The author did not specifically target primary students; rather, he collected information with high-level students and knowledgeable scholars in mind. As a result, he avoids complicated language when describing Fiqh and instead focuses on Hadith of Ahkamah from the Hanafi school. The methodology of the book involves citing authentic Hadiths and statements of the Companions that support the views of the Hanafi school of thought, with their sources mentioned at the top of the page. The narrations are then briefly evaluated regarding their chain of transmission and text, and weak narrations are included to support the authentic ones. At the bottom of the page, the narrations are criticized regarding their chain of transmission, text, and legal aspects. The book also cites quotations from reliable books of the Hanafi school where there are differences of opinion. It starts with the chapters of Islamic jurisprudence, from Kitabut Tahara to Kitabul Adab wa Tasawwuf.

Version 
This book has undergone several revisions and editions. The original work was published in eighteen volumes, with the first eleven volumes printed in Thana Bhawan, and volumes XII to XVIII published in Karachi. A subsequent edition was published in Karachi, which included corrections, numbered hadiths, and topic headings on each page. In 1997, a revised version was released by Muhammad al-'Azazi, spanning 22 volumes and published by Dar Kotob al-Ilmiyah. Furthermore, Taqi Usmani published an updated edition, comprising 19 volumes and featuring explanatory notes. One version of the book, called Jami al-Hadith al-Ahkam contains only the text of the narrations and the author's brief evaluations of them. This edition includes more than 6100 hadiths in the text section of the work.

Reception 
The book has garnered significant acclaim from a wide range of esteemed scholars. Ashraf Ali Thanwi, Zafar Ahmad Usmani's mentor, hailed Usmani as the Imaam Muhammad of this era and a fountainhead of religious knowledge. Thanwi held the view that the book alone was a remarkable achievement for the madrassa of Thana Bhawan. Muhammad Zahid al-Kawthari was deeply impressed by the author's meticulous research and unbiased approach towards other mazaahib, lauding the book as an exceptional compilation. Abd al-Fattah Abu Ghudda described the book as an immensely beneficial encyclopedic work, particularly relevant in response to the emergence of the Ahl al-Hadith movement in India. The scholars recognize the author's extensive knowledge and research in hadith and fiqh, and they hail the book as a valuable contribution to Islamic scholarship.

Legacy 
Both Md. Abdur Rouf and Ayşe Coşar are scholars of I'la al-Sunan. In 2015, Md. Abdur Rouf completed his PhD thesis entitled "Efforts and Methods of Al-Imam Zafar Ahmad Al-tahanawi in the Sunnah Al-Nabawiyyah" in Arabic at the University of Technology Malaysia. Similarly, in 2020, Ayşe Coşar completed her dissertation entitled "Fiqh Analysis of the Marriage Section of Tahanawi's I'la al-Sunan" in Turkish at Sivas Cumhuriyet University in Turkey.

See also 
Deobandi hadith studies

References

External links 
  at Internet Archive

Deobandi fiqh literature
Deobandi hadith literature
Hadith commentaries
Islamic literature
Sunni literature
Hanafi literature
Arabic-language books
20th-century Indian books
Indian non-fiction books
Indian religious texts